Aldo is a male given name, commonly found in Italy. People named Aldo include:

People

Given name
 Aldo Agroppi (born 1944), Italian football coach and a former footballer
 John Aldridge (born 1958), English-born Irish footballer nicknamed Aldo
 Aldo Andretti (1940-2020), American racing driver and entrepreneur
 Aldo Aniasi (1921–2005), Italian politician
 Aldo Baglio, Italian comedian and film actor
 Aldo Bensadoun (born 1939), Canadian businessman and philanthropist
 Aldo Bentini (born 1948), Italian boxer
 Aldo Bertocco (1911–1990), French racing cyclist
 Aldo Bozzi (1909–1987), Italian lawyer and politician
 Aldo Brancher (born 1943), Italian politician
 Aldo Busi (born 1948), Italian writer
 Aldo Buzzi (1910–2009), Italian author and architect
 Aldo Campatelli (1919–1984), Italian football manager and player
 Aldo Carosi (born 1951), Italian judge
 Aldo Ciccolini (1925–2015), Italian and French pianist
 Aldo Curti, Italian professional football player
 Aldo Donelli (1907–1994), American football and soccer player
 Aldo Giuffrè (1924–2010), Italian film actor and comedian
 Aldo Gucci (1905–1990), Italian businessman and Chairman of Gucci
 Aldo Lado (born 1934), Italian film director and screenwriter
 Aldo Leopold (1887–1948), American ecologist, forester, and environmentalist
 Aldo Moro (1916–1978), murdered Italian prime minister
 Aldo Moser (1934–2020), Italian racing cyclist
 Aldo Nova (born 1956), Canadian musician
 Aldo Novarese (1920-1995), Italian typographer
 Aldo Oviglio (1873–1942), Italian lawyer and politician
 Aldo Palazzeschi (1885–1974), Italian poet
 Aldo Ray (1926–1991), American actor
 Aldo Richins (1910–1995), Mexican player American football
 Aldo Rossi (1931–1997), Italian architect
 Aldo Sambrell, a European actor also known as Alfred Sanchez Bell
 Aldo Suurväli (born 1967), Estonian swimmer 
 Aldo van den Berg (born 1967), South African cricketer
 Aldus Manutius or Aldo Manuzio (died 1515), Italian humanist scholar, printer and publisher

Surname
 José Aldo (born 1986), Brazilian mixed martial artist

Characters
 Aldo, a 2007 character in the video game Summon Night: Twin Age
Aldo, one of the two protagonists from the animated television series Sitting Ducks
 Aldo (Planet of the Apes), a gorilla character in the Planet of the Apes series of movies
 Aldo, the main character in the Italian comic strip Venerdì 12
 Aldo, a minor character in the television series Lost
 Aldo Burrows, a character from the television series Prison Break
 Aldo Kelrast, a character from the comic strip Mary Worth
 Aldo Raine, a character from the film Inglourious Basterds
 Aldo Trapani, the main character of The Godfather: The Game
 Aldo, a character in Story Teller

Italian masculine given names